Paul Hindemith (16 November 189528 December 1963) was a German composer, music theorist, teacher, violist and conductor. He founded the Amar Quartet in 1921, touring extensively in Europe. As a composer, he became a major advocate of the Neue Sachlichkeit (new objectivity) style of music in the 1920s, with compositions such as Kammermusik, including works with viola and viola d'amore as solo instruments in a neo-Bachian spirit. Other notable compositions include his song cycle Das Marienleben (1923), Der Schwanendreher for viola and orchestra (1935), the opera Mathis der Maler (1938), the Symphonic Metamorphosis of Themes by Carl Maria von Weber (1943), and the oratorio When Lilacs Last in the Dooryard Bloom'd, a requiem based on Walt Whitman's poem (1946).

Life and career 
Hindemith was born in Hanau, near Frankfurt, the eldest child of the painter and decorator Robert Hindemith from Lower Silesia and his wife Marie Hindemith, née Warnecke. He was taught the violin as a child. He entered Frankfurt's Dr. Hoch's Konservatorium, where he studied violin with Adolf Rebner, as well as conducting and composition with Arnold Mendelssohn and Bernhard Sekles. At first he supported himself by playing in dance bands and musical-comedy groups. He became deputy leader of the Frankfurt Opera Orchestra in 1914 and was promoted to concertmaster in 1916. He played second violin in the Rebner String Quartet from 1914.

Hindemith was conscripted into the Imperial German Army in September 1917 and sent to join his regiment in Alsace in January 1918. There he was assigned to play bass drum in the regiment band and also formed a string quartet. In May 1918 he was deployed to the front in Flanders, where he served as a sentry; his diary has him "surviving grenade attacks only by good luck", according to New Grove Dictionary. After the armistice he returned to Frankfurt and the Rebner Quartet.

In 1921, he founded the Amar Quartet, playing viola, and extensively toured Europe.

As a composer, he became a major advocate of the Neue Sachlichkeit (new objectivity) style of music in the 1920s, with compositions such as Kammermusik. Reminiscent of Bach's Brandenburg Concertos, they include works with viola and viola d'amore as solo instruments in a neo-Bachian spirit. In 1922, some of his pieces were played in the International Society for Contemporary Music festival at Salzburg, which first brought him to the attention of an international audience. The following year, he began to work as an organizer of the Donaueschingen Festival, where he programmed works by several avant-garde composers, including Anton Webern and Arnold Schoenberg. In 1927 he was appointed Professor at the Berliner Hochschule für Musik in Berlin. Hindemith wrote the music for Hans Richter's 1928 avant-garde film Ghosts Before Breakfast (Vormittagsspuk) and also acted in the film; the score and the original film were later burned by the Nazis. The score was recreated by Ian Gardiner in 2006. In 1929 he played the solo part in the premiere of William Walton's viola concerto, after Lionel Tertis, for whom it was written, turned it down.

On 15 May 1924, Hindemith married the actress and singer Gertrud (Johanna Gertrude) Rottenberg (1900–1967). The marriage was childless.

The Nazis' relationship to Hindemith's music was complicated. Some condemned his music as "degenerate" (largely based on his early, sexually charged operas such as Sancta Susanna). In December 1934, during a speech at the Berlin Sports Palace, Germany's Minister of Propaganda Joseph Goebbels publicly denounced Hindemith as an "atonal noisemaker". The Nazis banned his music in October 1936, and he was subsequently included in the 1938 Entartete Musik (Degenerate Music) exhibition in Düsseldorf. Other officials working in Nazi Germany, though, thought that he might provide Germany with an example of a modern German composer, as, by this time, he was writing music based in tonality, with frequent references to folk music. The conductor Wilhelm Furtwängler’s defence of Hindemith, published in 1934, takes this line. The controversy around his work continued throughout the thirties, with Hindemith falling in and out of favour with the Nazis.

During the 1930s, Hindemith visited Cairo and also Ankara several times. He accepted an invitation from the Turkish government to oversee the creation of a music school in Ankara in 1935, after Goebbels had pressured him to request an indefinite leave of absence from the Berlin Academy. In Turkey, he was the leading figure of a new music pedagogy in the era of president Kemal Atatürk. His deputy was Eduard Zuckmayer. Hindemith led the reorganization of Turkish music education and the early efforts to establish the Turkish State Opera and Ballet. He did not stay in Turkey as long as many other émigrés, but he greatly influenced Turkish musical life; the Ankara State Conservatory owes much to his efforts. Young Turkish musicians regarded Hindemith as a "real master", and he was appreciated and greatly respected.

Toward the end of the 1930s, Hindemith made several tours of America as a viola and viola d'amore soloist.

He emigrated to Switzerland in 1938, partly because his wife was of part-Jewish ancestry.

At the same time that he was codifying his musical language, Hindemith's teaching and compositions began to be affected by his theories, according to critics such as Ernest Ansermet. Arriving in the U.S. in 1940, he taught primarily at Yale University, where he founded the Yale Collegium Musicum. He had such notable students as Lukas Foss, Graham George, Andrew Hill, Norman Dello Joio, Mitch Leigh, Mel Powell, Yehudi Wyner, Harold Shapero, Hans Otte, Ruth Schönthal, Samuel Adler, Leonard Sarason, and Oscar-winning film director George Roy Hill. He also taught at the University at Buffalo, Cornell University, and Wells College. During this time he gave the Charles Eliot Norton Lectures at Harvard, from which the book A Composer's World was extracted. Hindemith had a long friendship with Erich Katz, whose compositions were influenced by him. Also among Hindemith's students were the composers Franz Reizenstein and Robert Strassburg.

Hindemith became a U.S. citizen in 1946, but returned to Europe in 1953, living in Zürich and teaching at the university there until he retired from teaching in 1957. Toward the end of his life he began to conduct more and made numerous recordings, mostly of his own music.

In 1954, an anonymous critic for Opera magazine, having attended a performance of Hindemith's Neues vom Tage, wrote, "Mr Hindemith is no virtuoso conductor, but he does possess an extraordinary knack of making performers understand how his own music is supposed to go".

Hindemith received the Wihuri Sibelius Prize in 1955. He was awarded the Balzan Prize in 1962 "for the wealth, extent and variety of his work, which is among the most valid in contemporary music, and which contains masterpieces of opera, symphonic and chamber music."

Despite a prolonged decline in his physical health, Hindemith composed almost until his death. He died in Frankfurt from pancreatitis aged 68. He is buried in Cimetière La Chiésaz, La Chiésaz, Canton of Vaud, Switzerland.

Music
Hindemith is among the most significant German composers of his time. His early works are in a late romantic idiom, and he later produced expressionist works, rather in the style of the early Schoenberg, before developing a leaner, contrapuntally complex style in the 1920s. This style has been described as neoclassical, but is quite different from the works by Igor Stravinsky labeled with that term, owing more to the contrapuntal language of Johann Sebastian Bach and Max Reger than the Classical clarity of Mozart.

The new style can be heard in the series of works called Kammermusik (Chamber Music) from 1922 to 1927. Each of these pieces is written for a different small instrumental ensemble, many of them very unusual. Kammermusik No. 6, for example, is a concerto for the viola d'amore, an instrument that has not been in wide use since the baroque period, but which Hindemith himself played. He continued to write for unusual groups of instruments throughout his life, producing a trio for viola, heckelphone and piano (1928), 7 trios for 3 trautoniums (1930), a sonata for double bass and a concerto for trumpet, bassoon, and strings (both in 1949), for example.

Around the 1930s, Hindemith began to write less for chamber groups, and more for large orchestral forces. In 1933–35, Hindemith wrote his opera Mathis der Maler, based on the life of the painter Matthias Grünewald. This opera is rarely staged, though a well-known production by the New York City Opera in 1995 was an exception (Holland 1995). It combines the neo-classicism of earlier works with folk song. As a preliminary stage to the composing of this opera, Hindemith wrote a purely instrumental symphony also called Mathis der Maler, which is one of his most frequently performed works. In the opera, some portions of the symphony appear  as instrumental interludes, others were elaborated in vocal scenes.

Hindemith wrote Gebrauchsmusik (Music for Use)—compositions intended to have a social or political purpose and sometimes written to be played by amateurs. The concept was inspired by Bertolt Brecht. An example of this is his Trauermusik (Funeral Music), written in January 1936. Hindemith was preparing the London premiere of Der Schwanendreher when he heard news of the death of George V. He quickly wrote this piece for solo viola and string orchestra in tribute to the late king, and the premiere was given that same evening, the day after the king's death. Other examples of Hindemith's Gebrauchsmusik include: 
 the Plöner Musiktage (1932): a series of pieces designed for a day of community music making open to all inhabitants of the city of Plön, culminating in an evening concert by grammar school students and teachers.
 a Scherzo for viola and cello (1934), written in several hours during a series of recording sessions as a "filler" for an unexpected blank side of a 78 rpm album, and recorded immediately upon its completion.
 Wir bauen eine Stadt ("We’re Building a City"), an opera for eight-year-olds (1930).

Hindemith's most popular work, both on record and in the concert hall, is probably the Symphonic Metamorphosis of Themes by Carl Maria von Weber, written in 1943. It takes melodies from various works by Weber, mainly piano duets, but also one from the overture to his incidental music for Turandot (Op. 37/J. 75), and transforms and adapts them so that each movement of the piece is based on one theme.

In 1951, Hindemith completed his Symphony in B-flat. Scored for concert band, it was written for the U.S. Army Band "Pershing's Own". Hindemith premiered it with that band on 5 April of that year. Its second performance took place under the baton of Hugh McMillan, conducting the Boulder Symphonic Band at the University of Colorado. The piece is representative of his late works, exhibiting strong contrapuntal lines throughout, and is a cornerstone of the band repertoire. Hindemith recorded it in stereo with members of the Philharmonia Orchestra for EMI in 1956.

Awards and Honors

 Howland Memorial Prize (1940), (highest honour awarded by Yale University)
 Elected to American Academy of Arts and Sciences (1940)
 Bach Prize of the Free and Hanseatic City of Hamburg (1951)
 Order Pour le Mérite (1952)
 Wihuri Sibelius Prize (1955)
 Goethe Plaque of the City of Frankfurt (1955)
 Elected to the American Philosophical Society (1962)
 Balzan Prize (1963)

Honorary doctorates
 Philadelphia Academy of Music (1945)
 Columbia University (1948)
 Goethe University Frankfurt (1949)
 FU Berlin (1950)
 Oxford University (1954)

Works

Pedagogical writings
His complete set of instructional books (in possible educational order)
 Elementary Training for Musicians 1946
 A Concentrated Course in Traditional Harmony: Book 1, Part 1—With Emphasis on Exercises and a Minimum of Rules, revised edition New York: Schott Music, 1968
 A Concentrated Course in Traditional Harmony: Book 2—Exercises for Advanced Students, translated by Arthur Mendel. New York: Schott, 1964
 The Craft of Musical Composition: Book 1—Theoretical Part, translated by Arthur Mendel (London: Schott & Co; New York: Associated Music Publishers. ), 1942 
 The Craft of Musical Composition: Book 2—Exercises in Two-Part Writing, translated by Otto Ortmann. (London: Schott & Co; New York: Associated Music Publishers. ) 1941
 Unterweisung im Tonsatz 3: Übungsbuch für den dreistimmigen Satz [The Craft of Musical Composition: Book 3—Exercises in Three-part Writing]. Mainz: Schott 5205, 251 pages. 1970. Only available in the original German.

Notable students

Recordings
Hindemith was a prolific composer. He conducted some of his own music in a series of recordings for EMI with the Philharmonia Orchestra and for Deutsche Grammophon with the Berlin Philharmonic Orchestra, which have been digitally remastered and released on CD. The Violin Concerto was also recorded by Hindemith for Decca/London, with the composer conducting the London Symphony Orchestra with David Oistrakh as soloist. Everest Records issued a recording of Hindemith's postwar When Lilacs Last in the Dooryard Bloom'd ("A Requiem for Those We Love") on LP, conducted by Hindemith. A stereo recording of Hindemith conducting the requiem with the New York Philharmonic Orchestra, with Louise Parker and George London as soloists, was made for Columbia Records in 1963 and later issued on CD. He also appeared on television as a guest conductor of the Chicago Symphony Orchestra's nationally syndicated "Music from Chicago" series; the performances have been released by VAI on home video. A complete orchestral music collection has been recorded by German and Australian orchestras, all released on the CPO label, recordings all conducted by Werner Andreas Albert.

Hindemithon Festival
An annual festival of Hindemith's music is held at William Paterson University in Wayne, New Jersey.  It features student, staff, and professional musicians performing a range of Hindemith's works.

Media

See also
 Music written in all major and/or minor keys

References

Notes

Sources
 Ansermet, Ernest. 1961. Les fondements de la musique dans la conscience humaine. 2 v. Neuchâtel: La Baconnière.
 Briner, Andres. 1971. Paul Hindemith. Zürich: Atlantis-Verlag; Mainz: Schott.
Bruhn, Siglind (1998). The Temptation of Paul Hindemith. Mathis der Maler as a Spiritual Testimony. Stuyvesant, NY: Pendragon Press. .
Bruhn, Siglind. 2000. Musical Ekphrasis in Rilke's Marienleben. Internationale Forschungen zur allgemeinen und vergleichenden Literaturwissenschaft 47. Amsterdam: Rodopi. .
Bruhn, Siglind. 2005. The Musical Order of the World: Kepler, Hesse, Hindemith. Interplay, no. 4. Hillsdale, NY: Pendragon Press. .
Davenport, LaNoue. 1970. ""Erich Katz: A Profile"". The American Recorder (Spring): 43–44. Retrieved 2 November 2011.
 Furtwängler, Wilhelm. 1934. "Der Fall Hindemith". Deutsche Allgemeine Zeitung 73, no. 551 (Sunday, 25 November): 1. Reprinted in Berta Geissmar, Musik im Schatten der Politik. Zürich: Atlantis, 1945. Reprinted in Wilhelm Furtwängler, Ton und Wort: Aufsätze und Vorträge 1918 bis 1954, 91–96. Wiesbaden: F.A. Brockhaus, 1954; reissued Zürich: Atlantis Musikbuch-Verlag, 1994. . English version as "The Hindemith Case", in Wilhelm Furtwängler, Furtwängler on Music, edited and translated by Ronald Taylor, 117–20. Aldershot, Hants.: Scolar Press, 1991. .
 Eaglefield-Hull, Arthur. (Ed.). 1924. A Dictionary of Modern Music and Musicians. London: Dent.
 Hindemith, Paul. 1937–70. Unterweisung im Tonsatz. 3 vols. Mainz, B. Schott's Söhne. First two volumes in English, as The Craft of Musical Composition, translated by Arthur Mendel and Otto Ortmann. New York: Associated Music Publishers; London: Schott & Co., 1941–42.
 Hindemith, Paul. 1952. A Composer's World, Horizons and Limitations. Cambridge: Harvard University Press.
 Holland, Bernard. 1995. "Music Review; City Opera Gamely Flirts with Danger". New York Times, 9 September.
 Kater, Michael H. 1997. The Twisted Muse: Musicians and Their Music in the Third Reich. New York and Oxford: Oxford University Press.
 Kater, Michael H. 2000. Composers of the Nazi Era: Eight Portraits. New York and Oxford: Oxford University Press.
 Kemp, Ian. 1970. Hindemith. Oxford Studies of Composers 6. London, New York: Oxford University Press.
 Neumeyer, David. 1986. The Music of Paul Hindemith. New Haven: Yale University Press.
 Noss, Luther. 1989. Paul Hindemith in the United States. Urbana: University of Illinois Press.
 Preussner, Eberhard. 1984. Paul Hindemith: ein Lebensbild. Innsbruck: Edition Helbling.
 Skelton, Geoffrey. 1975. Paul Hindemith: The Man Behind the Music: A Biography. London: Gollancz.
 Taylor, Ronald. 1997. Berlin and Its Culture: A Historical Portrait. Yale University Press. .
 Taylor-Jay, Claire. 2004. The Artist-Operas of Pfitzner, Krenek and Hindemith: Politics and the Ideology of the Artist. Aldershot: Ashgate.

Further reading
 
 
 Desbruslais, Simon. 2019. The Music and Music Theory of Paul Hindemith. Woodbridge: Boydell Press. .
 Luttmann, Stephen. 2013. Paul Hindemith: A Research and Information Guide. New York: Routledge. .
 
 Petropoulos, Jonathan. 2014. Artists Under Hitler: Collaboration and Survival in Nazi Germany. New Haven and London: Yale University Press. Ch. 5, pp. 88–113, is titled "Paul Hindemith."

External links

Paul Hindemith Oral History collection at Oral History of American Music

Hindemith Foundation
Hindemith Foundation Catalogue of Works
Schott Music Publisher page
An Inner Emigration, notes on Hindemith and Der Schwanendreher by Ron Drummond
 Paul Hindemith in conversation with Seymour Raven (7 April 1963)
 
 
 

1895 births
1963 deaths
20th-century classical composers
20th-century German conductors (music)
20th-century German composers
Ballet composers
Composers for viola
Deaths from pancreatitis
German classical violists
German male conductors (music)
German Army personnel of World War I
German expatriates in Turkey
German Lutherans
German male classical composers
German opera composers
Harvard University faculty
Hoch Conservatory alumni
Honorary Members of the Royal Philharmonic Society
Male opera composers
Neoclassical composers
People from Hesse-Nassau
Emigrants from Nazi Germany to the United States
Pupils of Bernhard Sekles
Recipients of the Pour le Mérite (civil class)
Yale School of Music faculty
20th-century German male musicians
20th-century Lutherans
20th-century violists
Members of the American Philosophical Society